Holy Blood is an alternative term for the Blood of Christ and may refer to:

 Basilica of the Holy Blood, a church in Bruges
 Heiligenblut am Großglockner, a municipality in Austria
 Holy Blood (band), a Ukrainian Christian black / folk metal band
 Holy Blood of Wilsnack, a pilgrim site in Germany
 Procession of the Holy Blood, a procession in Bruges
 Santa Sangre, a film by Alejandro Jodorowsky
 The Holy Blood and the Holy Grail, a book by Michael Baigent, Richard Leigh, and Henry Lincoln
 The Relic of the Holy Blood sent from Jerusalem to England in 1247